Walton is a village and civil parish, on the Polden Hills,  west of Street in the Mendip district of Somerset, England. The parish includes the hamlet of Asney.

History
Saxon pressure seems to have driven the Britons from the immediate area around 650 A.D. About 700 A.D. the former Celtic monastery at Glastonbury was revived under royal Saxon patronage. By about 740 A.D. the general lines of parish boundaries in this area seem to have been fixed. This early development may well have been due to the organising urges of the monastic authorities. The parish of Walton was part of the Whitley Hundred, which took its name from Whitley Wood in the parish.

The name Walton comes from settlement/farmstead of Wealas — native Celts which is what the new Anglo Saxon speaking peoples called the native inhabitants of England.
There is strong evidence that in many areas of England taken over by Germanic speaking settlers, the native British (Wealas) remained undisturbed, farming the same land they did when the Romans left.
Over time they just adopted or forgot their Celtic tongue (similar to Old Welsh/Cornish) for the language and culture of the newcomers in order to climb the social ladder or were coerced to do so.
It was in the Anglo Saxon interest that the native British carry on as usual to ensure the economy produced food and goods for the new landowners.

Walton was a manor of Glastonbury Abbey at the time of the Domesday Book, which talks about 30 hides. A hide for tax purposes (Danegeld) was counted as about  worked under the 3 field system. With the Dissolution of the monasteries and the scramble for monastic assets, Sir John Thynne of Longleat acquired Walton; lock, stock and barrel. The entire village was owned by the Bath estate until sold by auction in 1939.

The population rose slowly from the 150 or so in 1087 to nearly 400 in 1801, and nearly 800 by 1845. Emigration, enclosures and agricultural depression severely drove down the numbers as the 19th century rolled on.

With the rise in importance of Street and the growth of a more varied, mobile society, the population started to rise again.

Governance
The parish council has responsibility for local issues, including setting an annual precept (local rate) to cover the council’s operating costs and producing annual accounts for public scrutiny. The parish council evaluates local planning applications and works with the local police, district council officers, and neighbourhood watch groups on matters of crime, security, and traffic. The parish council's role also includes initiating projects for the maintenance and repair of parish facilities, as well as consulting with the district council on the maintenance, repair, and improvement of highways, drainage, footpaths, public transport, and street cleaning. Conservation matters (including trees and listed buildings) and environmental issues are also the responsibility of the council.

The village falls within the Non-metropolitan district of Mendip, which was formed on 1 April 1974 under the Local Government Act 1972, having previously been part of Wells Rural District, which is responsible for local planning and building control, local roads, council housing, environmental health, markets and fairs, refuse collection and recycling, cemeteries and crematoria, leisure services, parks, and tourism.

Somerset County Council is responsible for running the largest and most expensive local services such as education, social services, libraries, main roads, public transport, policing and  fire services, trading standards, waste disposal and strategic planning.

The village falls within the 'Moor' electoral ward. The ward stretches north to Meare. The total population of the ward at the 2011 census is 2,540.

It is also part of the Wells county constituency represented in the House of Commons of the Parliament of the United Kingdom. It elects one Member of Parliament (MP) by the first past the post system of election.

Landmarks
Walton windmill was described as "new-erected" in 1741. It was worked until 1906. It is now a private residence.

Walton Hill, part of the Polden Hills, on which there are remains of ancient earthworks, rises south of the village.  The hill is part of a Site of Special Scientific Interest.

Religious sites
A Norman church was erected at about 1150 and rebuilt about 1350, when Street church was going up. Street was one of the 'seven churches' claimed by the Abbey under the Ina charter. Walton was in effect a chapelry of Street but the rectors of Street — when resident — lived at Walton in some style. The Old Parsonage is believed to be what remains of the monastic manor courthouse with an attached house.

The Church of The Holy Trinity was rebuilt in 1866 by John Norton with carved work by Seymour of Taunton. It is a Grade II listed building.

Notable residents
There is no evidence in the parish registers or other documents pertaining to Walton to support the popular notion the family of William Henry Smith the founder of W H Smith came from Walton.  This idea seems to have taken root from William Henry SMITH's father having Walton as a middle name and is more likely to have been either the surname of a relative, friend or business associate.  It could also be a mistranscription of Walter.

References

External links

Villages in Mendip District
Civil parishes in Somerset